Black Rain may refer to:

Atmospheric events
 Nuclear fallout, particularly with regard to the atomic bombings of Hiroshima and Nagasaki
 Rain polluted with dark particulates such as rain dust

Film and television
 Black Rain (1977 film) or The Last Wave, an Australian film directed by Peter Weir
 Black Rain (1989 American film), a film directed by Ridley Scott
 Black Rain (1989 Japanese film), a film directed by Shohei Imamura based on Masuji Ibuse's novel (see below)
 Black rain, a fictional atmospheric phenomenon in season 4 of the TV series The 100

Music
 Black Rain (band), an American electro-industrial group
 Black Rain (EP), by Black Rain, 1992
 Black Rain (Live EP), by Black Rain 1993
 DJ Sequenza – Black Rain 2003
 Black Rain (Dark Lotus album), 2004
 Black Rain (Ozzy Osbourne album), 2007
 "Black Rain" (Ozzy Osbourne song), the title song
 "Black Rain" (Creeper song), 2017
 "Black Rain" (Soundgarden song), 2010
 "Black Rain", a song by Blink-182 from Nine, 2019
 "Black Rain", a song by Keane from Strangeland, 2012

Other uses
 Black Rain (novel), a 1965 novel by Masuji Ibuse
 Blackra1n, an application for jailbreaking iPods and iPhones
 Operation Black Rain, a 2008 operation by the U.S. Bureau of Alcohol, Tobacco, Firearms and Explosives

See also
 Black rainstorm signal, the third level of Hong Kong rainstorm warning signals
 Schwarzer Regen (lit. Black Rain), a fictional exoskeleton in the Japanese light novel series Infinite Stratos
 Black Reign (disambiguation)